Li Han may refer to:

 Emperor Wenzong of Tang (809–840), né Li Han, emperor of the Tang Dynasty of China
 Li Han (aviator), Chinese Korean War flying ace
 Li Han (judoka) (born 1987), Chinese judoka

See also
 Han Li